Skaha Bluffs Provincial Park is a provincial park in British Columbia, Canada. Skaha Bluffs lies within the asserted territory of the Okanagan Nation Alliance.
World-class climbing opportunities are found at Skaha Bluffs, recreational climbing has been occurring in the area since the 1980s.

History 
The greater land area holds tremendous spiritual and cultural significance to the Okanagan Nation.
The park was created by the Protected Areas of British Columbia Amendment Act, 2009 with 179 ha of land adjacent to Skaha Lake, south of Penticton. The Protected Areas of British Columbia Amendment Act, 2010 added more land to the park, making it a total of 489 ha.

Images

References

Provincial parks of British Columbia
Provincial parks in the Okanagan
Regional District of Okanagan-Similkameen
2009 establishments in British Columbia
Protected areas established in 2009
Articles containing video clips